Jefe is a song by Ninho released. It was released on 3 December 2021 as with the release of his album of the same name.

Charts

Weekly charts

Year-end charts

References

2021 singles
2021 songs
French-language songs
Ninho songs
Number-one singles in France